Jordan Simmons (born July 15, 1994) is an American football guard who is a free agent. He played college football at the University of Southern California.

Early life and high school career
Simmons was born and raised in Inglewood, California and attended Susan Miller Dorsey High School and Crespi Carmelite High School. Simmons excelled on the Celts football team and was rated as a five-star recruit and the 2nd best offensive line prospect in the country as a senior.

College career
Simmons was a member of the USC Trojans football team for five seasons, redshirting his freshman year. Throughout his collegiate career, Simmons struggled with knee injuries and appeared in only nine games during the course of redshirt freshman and sophomore seasons as a reserve. As a redshirt junior, Simmons moved to defensive tackle but only appeared in one game due to injury. During his redshirt senior season, Simmons appeared in all 13 of the Trojans games and made two starts. Simmons appealed to the NCAA for a sixth year of eligibility, but his request was denied.

Professional career

Oakland Raiders
Simmons was signed by the Oakland Raiders on April 29, 2017. He was cut at the end of training camp and subsequently re-signed to the team's practice squad on September 4, 2017. Simmons remained on the Raiders practice squad for the entirety of the 2017 season and signed a reserve/future contract to stay with the team on January 2, 2018 but was waived on September 1, 2018 at the end of training camp.

Seattle Seahawks
Simmons was claimed off waivers by the Seattle Seahawks on September 2, 2018. Simmons made his NFL debut on September 30, 2018 against the Arizona Cardinals. Simmons made his first career start at right guard on November 11, 2018 against the Los Angeles Rams in place of an injured D. J. Fluker. He was placed on injured reserve on December 18, 2018 with a knee injury. He played in six games, starting three at right guard.

On August 31, 2019, Simmons was placed on injured reserve. On April 8, 2020, Simmons was re-signed by the Seahawks. He was re-signed again on March 26, 2021. He was released on August 31, 2021. He was re-signed to the practice squad on September 6.

Las Vegas Raiders
On September 15, 2021, Simmons was signed by the Las Vegas Raiders off the Seahawks practice squad.

Buffalo Bills
On July 25, 2022, Simmons signed with the Buffalo Bills. He was waived on August 14, 2022.

References

External links
Seattle Seahawks bio
USC Trojans bio

1994 births
Living people
Players of American football from Inglewood, California
American football offensive guards
USC Trojans football players
Oakland Raiders players
Seattle Seahawks players
Las Vegas Raiders players
Buffalo Bills players